Ictidomys is a North American genus of rodent in the squirrel family, which contains the thirteen-lined ground squirrel, the Mexican ground squirrel, and the Rio Grande ground squirrel. These species were included in the species-rich ground squirrel genus Spermophilus until molecular data showed that this genus was not a natural, monophyletic grouping.

References
 
 

 
Rodent genera
Taxa named by Joel Asaph Allen